Haakon Oliver Karlsen (born 27 June 1888) was a Norwegian politician.

He was born in Fredrikstad to saw mill worker Karl Efraim Karlsen and Anna Dorthea Andersen. He was elected representative to the Storting for the period 1928–1930, for the Labour Party. He served as mayor of Fredrikstad from 1925.

References

1888 births
Year of death missing
People from Fredrikstad
Mayors of places in Østfold
Labour Party (Norway) politicians
Members of the Storting